"Two Stories" is the thirteenth episode of the seventh season of the American medical drama House. It aired on February 21, 2011. The entire narrative of the episode takes place through a series of flashbacks within flashbacks similar to the Season 1 episode "Three Stories".

Plot
An elderly recess lady catches two students, Zack and Colleen, kissing behind the Brye Park school. When they are escorted to the principal's office, they see House sitting outside.

Hours earlier, House, calling himself Dr. Hourani, was a speaker at the school's Career Day as a favor to get Cuddy's daughter Rachel into Brye Park in order to show Cuddy that he cares about her. He is talking to the class about his latest case that involves a patient who just coughed up a lung, however, a boy in the class believes he is lying because he tells his story using the plot from Pulp Fiction.

Colleen and Zack interrupt his story demand to know what House did to get sent to the principal's office. House deflects by asking Colleen how she got her black eye. They make a deal that they will tell House how Colleen got a black eye if House tells them how an adult can get sent to the principal's office.

Back in his story, House admits that he was trying to make his presentation interesting. He tells them about the parts of the story that are true and shares his opinion on his job with the students. The teacher asks House to tell what he actually does and walk them through a "routine physical". House then tells the fifth grade class about a middle-aged woman who is overusing her vibrator. The teacher decides to move on but not without allowing House to finish his story.

In his story, House invites Cuddy to lunch but she says no and calls him a jerk. Colleen, back in the principal's office, wants to know why Cuddy is angry at House. After an argument between Colleen and House, House gets Colleen to tell him a small part of her story after accusing her of being a tease. This flashes back to the student's storyline where Colleen yells at Zach, calling him a loser, which she says proves that she's not a tease.

House now tells the class, in his flashback, about the patient portraying his staff in a stereotypical fashion with Chase and Taub hitting on the nurse and Masters threatening to tell Cuddy. Realizing he is never going to finish his story, the teacher asks House to step down, and when the class protests House tries lying, but they call him on it. House is now at the part of the story where the patient coughs up his lung.

In his office, House is trying to hack into Cuddy's password-protected laptop. Masters suggests that the patient's computer science major roommates might well be working with toxic, lung-destroying materials, but House says he actually has sarcoidosis.

The class now queries how he stole the laptop, which House eventually reveals he spilt hydrogen sulfide and ammonia on the floor in the clinic to drive everyone out so he could sneak into Cuddy's office and grab it. When Colleen asks why, House dodges the question. Cut to Zack and Colleen facing off against each other in a game of Double Dutch. Colleen trips up on the rope, giving Zack the win. His prize is that she kisses him on the lips. Zack explains that by losing the bet, Colleen could kiss him, which she wanted to do, while saving face with her friends.

Colleen denies Zack's reasoning and nags House to tell them why Cuddy is angry with him. House talks about using Cuddy's toothbrush and not taking out the trash. It cuts back to Zack/Colleen's storyline. The children are playing indoor hockey in gym class. Zack gets a shot on goal, tended by Colleen. He fires the puck right and hits her below her eye.

Now in House's flashback telling the story to the class, the real Dr. Hourani enters his office and finds House sitting at his desk, using Cuddy's laptop while hiding in Hourani's office. Back in the classroom, the class stops House's story to ask why he's talking about breaking into Dr. Hourani's office when they all thought House was Dr. Hourani.

Outside the principal's office, House gets a call from Foreman. The tests for sarcoidosis came back negative, but Zack wants to know why House lied about his last name while Colleen wants to know what House found in Cuddy's journal. Colleen finds out she was right that House doesn't listen to her. Zack asks if House fixed everything with Cuddy after hacking into her laptop. House says he thought he did by doing a favor for the Chairman of the Board and help get Rachel into a top pre-school.

House is driving to Brye Park's Career Day to speak to students and traumatize them for life when Foreman and Martha call about their patient. Their insistence on arguing with House distracts him from his driving and he rear-ends someone. The man who gets out of his crumpled car is familiar to us: it's the advertising salesman. House told Don his name is Dr. Hourani to get out of paying for the damage. Don tries to search House's pockets, which turns into a fight. They're stopped by the office secretary.

Zack thinks House should run, because that's what he would do, while Colleen disagrees. It flashes back to another behind the school meeting. Zack was ready to collect his bet winnings and kiss Colleen, but ultimately, he couldn't because he didn't want it to happen "like that." He apologizes for hitting her with the puck and cheating to win the bet. Colleen tells House that he should do what Zack did and then the principal arrives.

While being interrogated by the principal for his behavior, House notices a poster for "The Princess and the Pea" on the wall of her office. House returns and give the diagnosis is that the patient accidentally and unknowingly inhaled a tiny piece of food.

Later in Cuddy's office, House says he was just trying to show her that he does care about her needs, as well as Rachel's. Cuddy points out that he stole her computer. House admits that he's a moron, but he's a moron who cares and thinks about Cuddy and wants her to be happy. Cuddy invites him over for dinner. He immediately accepts, and shows her the toothbrush he'll be bringing and using while he's there.

Reception

Critical response  
This episode was ranked 39th on thefutoncritic's 50 best television episodes of 2011.

References

External links 

 [ "Two Stories"] at Fox.com
 

House (season 7) episodes
2011 American television episodes